James Vincent Young (born November 14, 1949) is an American musician who is best known as the lead guitarist in the American rock band Styx, having served as the only continuous original member of the band. Young began playing keyboard and piano at the age of five. He attended Calumet High in Chicago and learned to play clarinet and guitar during those years. He was nicknamed by Styx members & long time fans as "J.Y." and is often referred to as "The Godfather of Styx".

In 1970, Young joined the band TW4 while a student at Illinois Institute of Technology, from which he graduated with a bachelor's degree in mechanical and aerospace engineering. That band later became the first incarnation of Styx.

After Styx's initial breakup in 1984, Young released the solo albums City Slicker (1985) with Jan Hammer, Out on a Day Pass (1988), and Raised by Wolves (1995 ) with James Young Group. Young tends to write the more hard rock pieces for Styx. He is best known for the Styx songs "Miss America" and "Snowblind". Young managed the Chicago, Illinois -based rock band 7th Heaven in 1998 along with Alec John Such of the band Bon Jovi.

Discography

Styx 

 Styx (1972)
 Styx II (1973)
 The Serpent Is Rising (1973)
 Man of Miracles (1974)
 Equinox (1975)
 Crystal Ball (1976)
 The Grand Illusion (1977)
 Pieces of Eight (1978)
 Cornerstone (1979)
 Paradise Theater (1981)
 Kilroy Was Here (1983)
 Caught in the Act (Live, 1984)
 Edge of the Century (1990)
 Return to Paradise (Live, 1997)
 Brave New World (1999)
 Arch Allies: Live at Riverport (Live, 2000)
 Styx World: Live 2001 (Live, 2001)
 At the River's Edge: Live in St. Louis (Live, 2002)
 Cyclorama (2003)
 21st Century Live (Live, 2003)
 Big Bang Theory (2005)
 One with Everything: Styx and the Contemporary Youth Orchestra (Live, 2006)
 The Grand Illusion, Pieces of Eight Live (Live, 2012)
 Live at the Orleans Arena Las Vegas (Live, 2015)
 The Mission (2017)
 Crash of the Crown (2021)

Solo studio albums 
 City Slicker (1985),  with Jan Hammer
 Out on a Day Pass (1988)
 Raised by Wolves (1995), with James Young Group

References

External links 

 Unofficial James "JY" Young website
 James Young's bio- and discography at TommyShaw.net
 James Young's bio- and discography at AllMusic.com
 James Young's bio- and discography at Discogs.com
 James Young's bio- and discography at WaterdogMusic.com
 JY Career Retrospective Interview from 2017 with The Pods & Sods Network

1949 births
American rock guitarists
American male guitarists
American rock singers
American baritones
Singers from Chicago
Illinois Institute of Technology alumni
Living people
Styx (band) members
Lead guitarists
American male singer-songwriters
Guitarists from Chicago
20th-century American guitarists
Singer-songwriters from Illinois